In mathematics and physics, a vector space (also called a linear space) is a set whose elements, often called vectors, may be added together and multiplied ("scaled") by numbers called scalars. Scalars are often real numbers, but can be  complex numbers or, more generally, elements of any field. The operations of vector addition and scalar multiplication must satisfy certain requirements, called vector axioms. The terms real vector space and complex vector space are often used to specify the nature of the scalars: real coordinate space or complex coordinate space.

Vector spaces generalize Euclidean vectors, which allow modeling of physical quantities, such as forces and velocity, that have not only a magnitude, but also a direction. The concept of vector spaces is fundamental for linear algebra, together with the concept of matrix, which allows computing in vector spaces. This provides a concise and synthetic way for manipulating and studying systems of linear equations.

Vector spaces are characterized by their dimension, which, roughly speaking, specifies the number of independent directions in the space. This means that, for two vector spaces with the same dimension, the properties that depend only on the vector-space structure are exactly the same (technically the vector spaces are isomorphic). A vector space is finite-dimensional if its dimension is a natural number. Otherwise, it is infinite-dimensional, and its dimension is an infinite cardinal. Finite-dimensional vector spaces occur naturally in geometry and related areas. Infinite-dimensional vector spaces occur in many areas of mathematics. For example, polynomial rings are countably infinite-dimensional vector spaces, and many function spaces have the cardinality of the continuum as a dimension.

Many vector spaces that are considered in mathematics are also endowed with other structures. This is the case of algebras, which include field extensions, polynomial rings, associative algebras and Lie algebras. This is also the case of topological vector spaces, which include function spaces, inner product spaces, normed spaces, Hilbert spaces and Banach spaces.

Definition and basic properties
In this article, vectors are represented in boldface to distinguish them from scalars.

A vector space over a field  is a non-empty set  together with two binary operations that satisfy the eight axioms listed below.

When the scalar field is the real numbers the vector space is called a real vector space. When the scalar field is the complex numbers, the vector space is called a complex vector space. These two cases are the most common ones, but vector spaces with scalars in an arbitrary field  are also commonly considered.

An equivalent definition of a vector space can be given, which is much more concise but less elementary: the first four axioms (related to vector addition) say that a vector space is an abelian group under addition, and the four remaining axioms (related to the scalar multiplication), say that this operation defines a ring homomorphism from the field  into the endomorphism ring of this group.

Subtraction of two vectors can be defined as

Direct consequences of the axioms include that, for every  and  one has

 implies  or

Related concepts and properties

Linear combination
Linear independence
Equivalently, they are linearly independent if two linear combinations of element of  define the same element of  if and only if they have the same coefficients. Also equivalently, they are linearly independent if a linear combination results in the zero vector if and only if all its coefficients are zero.
Linear subspace
A linear subspace is a vector space for the induced addition and scalar multiplication; this means that the closure property implies that the axioms of a vector space are satisfied.The closure property also implies that every intersection of linear subspaces is a linear subspace.
Linear span
Basis and dimension
A subset of a vector space is a basis if its elements are linearly independent and span the vector space. Every vector space has at least one basis, generally many (see ). Moreover, all bases of a vector space have the same cardinality, which is called the dimension of the vector space (see Dimension theorem for vector spaces). This is a fundamental property of vector spaces, which is detailed in the remainder of the section.

Bases are a fundamental tool for the study of vector spaces, especially when the dimension is finite. In the infinite-dimensional case, the existence of infinite bases, often called Hamel bases, depend on the axiom of choice. It follows that, in general, no base can be explicitly described. For example, the real numbers form an infinite-dimensional vector space over the rational numbers, for which no specific basis is known. 

Consider a basis  of a vector space  of dimension  over a field . The definition of a basis implies that every  may be written 
 

The one-to-one correspondence between vectors and their coordinate vectors maps vector addition to vector addition and scalar multiplication to scalar multiplication. It is thus a vector space isomorphism, which allows translating reasonings and computations on vectors into reasonings and computations on their coordinates. If, in turn, these coordinates are arranged as matrices, these reasonings and computations on coordinates can be expressed concisely as reasonings and computations on matrices. Moreover, a linear equation relating matrices can be expanded into a system of linear equations, and, conversely, every such system can be compacted into a linear equation on matrices.

In summary, finite-dimensional linear algebra may be expressed in three equivalent languages:
Vector spaces, which provide concise and coordinate-free statements,
Matrices, which are convenient for expressing concisely explicit computations,
Systems of linear equations, which provide more elementary formulations.

History

Vector spaces stem from affine geometry, via the introduction of coordinates in the plane or three-dimensional space. Around 1636, French mathematicians René Descartes and Pierre de Fermat founded analytic geometry by identifying solutions to an equation of two variables with points on a plane curve. To achieve geometric solutions without using coordinates, Bolzano introduced, in 1804, certain operations on points, lines and planes, which are predecessors of vectors.  introduced the notion of barycentric coordinates.  introduced an equivalence relation on directed line segments that share the same length and direction which he called equipollence. A Euclidean vector is then an equivalence class of that relation. 

Vectors were reconsidered with the presentation of complex numbers by Argand and Hamilton and the inception of quaternions by the latter. They are elements in R2 and R4; treating them using linear combinations goes back to Laguerre in 1867, who also defined systems of linear equations.

In 1857, Cayley introduced the matrix notation which allows for a harmonization and simplification of linear maps. Around the same time, Grassmann studied the barycentric calculus initiated by Möbius. He envisaged sets of abstract objects endowed with operations. In his work, the concepts of linear independence and dimension, as well as scalar products are present. Actually Grassmann's 1844 work exceeds the framework of vector spaces, since his considering multiplication, too, led him to what are today called algebras. Italian mathematician Peano was the first to give the modern definition of vector spaces and linear maps in 1888, although he called them "linear systems".

An important development of vector spaces is due to the construction of function spaces by Henri Lebesgue. This was later formalized by Banach and Hilbert, around 1920. At that time, algebra and the new field of functional analysis began to interact, notably with key concepts such as spaces of p-integrable functions and Hilbert spaces. Also at this time, the first studies concerning infinite-dimensional vector spaces were done.

Examples

Arrows in the plane
The first example of a vector space consists of arrows in a fixed plane, starting at one fixed point. This is used in physics to describe forces or velocities. This new arrow is called the sum of the two arrows, and is denoted . In the special case of two arrows on the same line, their sum is the arrow on this line whose length is the sum or the difference of the lengths, depending on whether the arrows have the same direction. It is denoted . When  is negative,  is defined as the arrow pointing in the opposite direction instead.

Equivalently,  is the sum .

Second example: ordered pairs of numbers
The sum of two such pairs and multiplication of a pair with a number is defined as follows:

and

The first example above reduces to this example, if an arrow is represented by a pair of Cartesian coordinates of its endpoint.

Coordinate space
The simplest example of a vector space over a field  is the field  itself (as it is an abelian group for addition, a part of the requirements to be a field), equipped with its addition (It becomes vector addition.) and multiplication (It becomes scalar multiplication.). More generally, all -tuples (sequences of length ) 

of elements  of  form a vector space that is usually denoted  and called a coordinate space. 
The case  is the above-mentioned simplest example, in which the field  is also regarded as a vector space over itself.

Complex numbers and other field extensions
The various axioms of a vector space follow from the fact that the same rules hold for complex number arithmetic.

In fact, the example of complex numbers is essentially the same as (that is, it is isomorphic to) the vector space of ordered pairs of real numbers mentioned above: if we think of the complex number  as representing the ordered pair  in the complex plane then we see that the rules for addition and scalar multiplication correspond exactly to those in the earlier example.

Function spaces

Functions from any fixed set  to a field  also form vector spaces, by performing addition and scalar multiplication pointwise.

and similarly for multiplication. Many notions in topology and analysis, such as continuity, integrability or differentiability are well-behaved with respect to linearity: sums and scalar multiples of functions possessing such a property still have that property. Therefore, the set of such functions are vector spaces, whose study belongs to functional analysis.

Linear equations

Systems of homogeneous linear equations are closely tied to vector spaces. For example, the solutions of 

are given by triples with arbitrary   and  They form a vector space: sums and scalar multiples of such triples still satisfy the same ratios of the three variables; thus they are solutions, too. Matrices can be used to condense multiple linear equations as above into one vector equation, namely

In a similar vein, the solutions of homogeneous linear differential equations form vector spaces. For example,

Linear maps and matrices

The relation of two vector spaces can be expressed by linear map or linear transformation. They are functions that reflect the vector space structure, that is, they preserve sums and scalar multiplication:
 
 

Equivalently,  is both one-to-one (injective) and onto (surjective).

For example, the "arrows in the plane" and "ordered pairs of numbers" vector spaces in the introduction are isomorphic: a planar arrow  departing at the origin of some (fixed) coordinate system can be expressed as an ordered pair by considering the - and -component of the arrow, as shown in the image at the right.

Via the injective natural map , any vector space can be embedded into its bidual; the map is an isomorphism if and only if the space is finite-dimensional.

It is an isomorphism, by its very definition. Therefore, two vector spaces are isomorphic if their dimensions agree and vice versa. Another way to express this is that any vector space is completely classified (up to isomorphism) by its dimension, a single number. The freedom of choosing a convenient basis is particularly useful in the infinite-dimensional context; see below.

Matrices

Matrices are a useful notion to encode linear maps. They are written as a rectangular array of scalars as in the image at the right.
 
where  denotes summation,
or, using the matrix multiplication of the matrix  with the coordinate vector 

The determinant  of a square matrix  is a scalar that tells whether the associated map is an isomorphism or not: to be so it is sufficient and necessary that the determinant is nonzero. The linear transformation of  corresponding to a real n-by-n matrix is orientation preserving if and only if its determinant is positive.

Eigenvalues and eigenvectors

Endomorphisms, linear maps , are particularly important since in this case vectors  can be compared with their image under , . Equivalently,  is an element of the kernel of the difference  (where Id is the identity map . If  is finite-dimensional, this can be rephrased using determinants:   having eigenvalue  is equivalent to

If the field  is large enough to contain a zero of this polynomial (which automatically happens for  algebraically closed, such as ) any linear map has at least one eigenvector. The vector space  may or may not possess an eigenbasis, a basis consisting of eigenvectors. This phenomenon is governed by the Jordan canonical form of the map. The set of all eigenvectors corresponding to a particular eigenvalue of  forms a vector space known as the eigenspace corresponding to the eigenvalue (and ) in question. To achieve the spectral theorem, the corresponding statement in the infinite-dimensional case, the machinery of functional analysis is needed, see below.

Basic constructions
In addition to the above concrete examples, there are a number of standard linear algebraic constructions that yield vector spaces related to given ones.

Subspaces and quotient spaces

The intersection of all subspaces containing a given set  of vectors is called its span, and it is the smallest subspace of  containing the set Expressed in terms of elements, the span is the subspace consisting of all the linear combinations of elements of 

A linear subspace of dimension 1 is a vector line.  A linear subspace of dimension 2 is a vector plane. A linear subspace that contains all elements but one of a basis of the ambient space is a vector hyperplane. In a vector space of finite dimension  a vector hyperplane is thus a subspace of dimension 

The counterpart to subspaces are quotient vector spaces.

The existence of kernels and images is part of the statement that the category of vector spaces (over a fixed field ) is an abelian category, that is, a corpus of mathematical objects and structure-preserving maps between them (a category) that behaves much like the category of abelian groups. Because of this, many statements such as the first isomorphism theorem (also called rank–nullity theorem in matrix-related terms)

and the second and third isomorphism theorem can be formulated and proven in a way very similar to the corresponding statements for groups.

An important example is the kernel of a linear map  for some fixed matrix  as above. The kernel of this map is the subspace of vectors  such that  which is precisely the set of solutions to the system of homogeneous linear equations belonging to  This concept also extends to linear differential equations

where the coefficients  are functions in  too.
In the corresponding map

Direct product and direct sum

The direct product of vector spaces and the direct sum of vector spaces are two ways of combining an indexed family of vector spaces into a new vector space.

The direct product  of a family of vector spaces  consists of the set of all tuples  which specify for each index  in some index set  an element  of  Addition and scalar multiplication is performed componentwise. A variant of this construction is the direct sum  (also called coproduct and denoted ), where only tuples with finitely many nonzero vectors are allowed. If the index set  is finite, the two constructions agree, but in general they are different.

Tensor product

A map  from the Cartesian product  is called bilinear if  is linear in both variables  and   That is to say, for fixed  the map  is linear in the sense above and likewise for fixed 

The tensor product is a particular vector space that is a universal recipient of bilinear maps  as follows. It is defined as the vector space consisting of finite (formal) sums of symbols called tensors

subject to the rules

The universality states that given any vector space  and any bilinear map  there exists a unique map  shown in the diagram with a dotted arrow, whose composition with  equals   This is called the universal property of the tensor product, an instance of the method—much used in advanced abstract algebra—to indirectly define objects by specifying maps from or to this object.

Vector spaces with additional structure
From the point of view of linear algebra, vector spaces are completely understood insofar as any vector space is characterized, up to isomorphism, by its dimension. However, vector spaces per se do not offer a framework to deal with the question—crucial to analysis—whether a sequence of functions converges to another function. Likewise, linear algebra is not adapted to deal with infinite series, since the addition operation allows only finitely many terms to be added. Therefore, the needs of functional analysis require considering additional structures.

A vector space may be given a partial order  under which some vectors can be compared. For example, -dimensional real space  can be ordered by comparing its vectors componentwise. Ordered vector spaces, for example Riesz spaces, are fundamental to Lebesgue integration, which relies on the ability to express a function as a difference of two positive functions

Normed vector spaces and inner product spaces

"Measuring" vectors is done by specifying a norm, a datum which measures lengths of vectors, or by an inner product, which measures angles between vectors. Norms and inner products are denoted  and  respectively. The datum of an inner product entails that lengths of vectors can be defined too, by defining the associated norm  Vector spaces endowed with such data are known as normed vector spaces and inner product spaces, respectively.

Coordinate space  can be equipped with the standard dot product:

Because of this, two vectors satisfying  are called orthogonal. An important variant of the standard dot product is used in Minkowski space:  endowed with the Lorentz product

In contrast to the standard dot product, it is not positive definite:  also takes negative values, for example, for  Singling out the fourth coordinate—corresponding to time, as opposed to three space-dimensions—makes it useful for the mathematical treatment of special relativity.

Topological vector spaces

Convergence questions are treated by considering vector spaces  carrying a compatible topology, a structure that allows one to talk about elements being close to each other. Compatible here means that addition and scalar multiplication have to be continuous maps.

In such topological vector spaces one can consider series of vectors. The infinite sum

denotes the limit of the corresponding finite partial sums of the sequence  of elements of  For example, the  could be (real or complex) functions belonging to some function space  in which case the series is a function series. The mode of convergence of the series depends on the topology imposed on the function space. In such cases, pointwise convergence and uniform convergence are two prominent examples.

A way to ensure the existence of limits of certain infinite series is to restrict attention to spaces where any Cauchy sequence has a limit; such a vector space is called complete. Roughly, a vector space is complete provided that it contains all necessary limits. For example, the vector space of polynomials on the unit interval  equipped with the topology of uniform convergence is not complete because any continuous function on  can be uniformly approximated by a sequence of polynomials, by the Weierstrass approximation theorem. A norm gives rise to a topology by defining that a sequence of vectors  converges to  if and only if

Banach and Hilbert spaces are complete topological vector spaces whose topologies are given, respectively, by a norm and an inner product. Their study—a key piece of functional analysis—focuses on infinite-dimensional vector spaces, since all norms on finite-dimensional topological vector spaces give rise to the same notion of convergence. In the infinite-dimensional case, however, there will generally be inequivalent topologies, which makes the study of topological vector spaces richer than that of vector spaces without additional data.

From a conceptual point of view, all notions related to topological vector spaces should match the topology. For example, instead of considering all linear maps (also called functionals)  maps between topological vector spaces are required to be continuous. In particular, the (topological) dual space  consists of continuous functionals  (or to ). The fundamental Hahn–Banach theorem is concerned with separating subspaces of appropriate topological vector spaces by continuous functionals.

Banach spaces

Banach spaces, introduced by Stefan Banach, are complete normed vector spaces.

A first example is the vector space  consisting of infinite vectors with real entries 
whose -norm  given by 

 
but 

More generally than sequences of real numbers, functions  are endowed with a norm that replaces the above sum by the Lebesgue integral 

The space of integrable functions on a given domain  (for example an interval) satisfying  and equipped with this norm are called Lebesgue spaces, denoted 

These spaces are complete. (If one uses the Riemann integral instead, the space is  complete, which may be seen as a justification for Lebesgue's integration theory.) Concretely this means that for any sequence of Lebesgue-integrable functions  with  satisfying the condition

there exists a function  belonging to the vector space  such that

Imposing boundedness conditions not only on the function, but also on its derivatives leads to Sobolev spaces.

Hilbert spaces

Complete inner product spaces are known as Hilbert spaces, in honor of David Hilbert. The Hilbert space  with inner product given by

By definition, in a Hilbert space any Cauchy sequence converges to a limit. Conversely, finding a sequence of functions  with desirable properties that approximates a given limit function, is equally crucial. Early analysis, in the guise of the Taylor approximation, established an approximation of differentiable functions  by polynomials. By the Stone–Weierstrass theorem, every continuous function on  can be approximated as closely as desired by a polynomial. A similar approximation technique by trigonometric functions is commonly called Fourier expansion, and is much applied in engineering, see below. More generally, and more conceptually, the theorem yields a simple description of what "basic functions", or, in abstract Hilbert spaces, what basic vectors suffice to generate a Hilbert space  in the sense that the closure of their span (that is, finite linear combinations and limits of those) is the whole space. Such a set of functions is called a basis of  its cardinality is known as the Hilbert space dimension. Not only does the theorem exhibit suitable basis functions as sufficient for approximation purposes, but also together with the Gram–Schmidt process, it enables one to construct a basis of orthogonal vectors. Such orthogonal bases are the Hilbert space generalization of the coordinate axes in finite-dimensional Euclidean space.

The solutions to various differential equations can be interpreted in terms of Hilbert spaces. For example, a great many fields in physics and engineering lead to such equations and frequently solutions with particular physical properties are used as basis functions, often orthogonal. As an example from physics, the time-dependent Schrödinger equation in quantum mechanics describes the change of physical properties in time by means of a partial differential equation, whose solutions are called wavefunctions. Definite values for physical properties such as energy, or momentum, correspond to eigenvalues of a certain (linear) differential operator and the associated wavefunctions are called eigenstates. The spectral theorem decomposes a linear compact operator acting on functions in terms of these eigenfunctions and their eigenvalues.

Algebras over fields

General vector spaces do not possess a multiplication between vectors. A vector space equipped with an additional bilinear operator defining the multiplication of two vectors is an algebra over a field. Many algebras stem from functions on some geometrical object: since functions with values in a given field can be multiplied pointwise, these entities form algebras. The Stone–Weierstrass theorem, for example, relies on Banach algebras which are both Banach spaces and algebras.

Commutative algebra makes great use of rings of polynomials in one or several variables, introduced above. Their multiplication is both commutative and associative. These rings and their quotients form the basis of algebraic geometry, because they are rings of functions of algebraic geometric objects.

  (anticommutativity), and
  (Jacobi identity).
Examples include the vector space of -by- matrices, with  the commutator of two matrices, and  endowed with the cross product.

The tensor algebra  is a formal way of adding products to any vector space  to obtain an algebra. As a vector space, it is spanned by symbols, called simple tensors

where the degree  varies.
The multiplication is given by concatenating such symbols, imposing the distributive law under addition, and requiring that scalar multiplication commute with the tensor product ⊗, much the same way as with the tensor product of two vector spaces introduced above.

When a field,  is explicitly stated, a common term used is -algebra.

Related structures

Vector bundles

A vector bundle is a family of vector spaces parametrized continuously by a topological space X. More precisely, a vector bundle over X is a topological space E equipped with a continuous map 

such that for every x in X, the fiber π−1(x) is a vector space. The case dim  is called a line bundle. For any vector space V, the projection  makes the product  into a "trivial" vector bundle. Vector bundles over X are required to be locally a product of X and some (fixed) vector space V: for every x in X, there is a neighborhood U of x such that the restriction of π to π−1(U) is isomorphic to the trivial bundle . Despite their locally trivial character, vector bundles may (depending on the shape of the underlying space X) be "twisted" in the large (that is, the bundle need not be (globally isomorphic to) the trivial bundle ). For example, the Möbius strip can be seen as a line bundle over the circle S1 (by identifying open intervals with the real line). It is, however, different from the cylinder , because the latter is orientable whereas the former is not.

Properties of certain vector bundles provide information about the underlying topological space. For example, the tangent bundle consists of the collection of tangent spaces parametrized by the points of a differentiable manifold. In contrast, by the hairy ball theorem, there is no (tangent) vector field on the 2-sphere S2 which is everywhere nonzero. K-theory studies the isomorphism classes of all vector bundles over some topological space. In addition to deepening topological and geometrical insight, it has purely algebraic consequences, such as the classification of finite-dimensional real division algebras: R, C, the quaternions H and the octonions O.

The cotangent bundle of a differentiable manifold consists, at every point of the manifold, of the dual of the tangent space, the cotangent space. Sections of that bundle are known as differential one-forms.

Modules

Modules are to rings what vector spaces are to fields: the same axioms, applied to a ring R instead of a field F, yield modules. The theory of modules, compared to that of vector spaces, is complicated by the presence of ring elements that do not have multiplicative inverses. For example, modules need not have bases, as the Z-module (that is, abelian group) Z/2Z shows; those modules that do (including all vector spaces) are known as free modules. Nevertheless, a vector space can be compactly defined as a module over a ring which is a field, with the elements being called vectors.  Some authors use the term vector space to mean modules over a division ring.  The algebro-geometric interpretation of commutative rings via their spectrum allows the development of concepts such as locally free modules, the algebraic counterpart to vector bundles.

Affine and projective spaces

 
Roughly, affine spaces are vector spaces whose origins are not specified. More precisely, an affine space is a set with a free transitive vector space action. In particular, a vector space is an affine space over itself, by the map

generalizing the homogeneous case above, which can be found by setting  in this equation. The space of solutions is the affine subspace  where x is a particular solution of the equation, and V is the space of solutions of the homogeneous equation (the nullspace of A).

The set of one-dimensional subspaces of a fixed finite-dimensional vector space V is known as projective space; it may be used to formalize the idea of parallel lines intersecting at infinity. Grassmannians and flag manifolds generalize this by parametrizing linear subspaces of fixed dimension k and flags of subspaces, respectively.

Related concepts
Specific vectors in a vector space
 Zero vector (sometimes also called null vector and denoted by ), the additive identity in a vector space. In a normed vector space, it is the unique vector of norm zero. In a Euclidean vector space, it is the unique vector of length zero.
 Basis vector, an element of a given basis of a vector space.
 Unit vector, a vector in a normed vector space whose norm is 1, or a Euclidean vector of length one.
 Isotropic vector or null vector, in a vector space with a quadratic form, a non-zero vector for which the form is zero. If a null vector exists, the quadratic form is said an isotropic quadratic form.

Vectors in specific vector spaces
 Column vector, a matrix with only one column. The column vectors with a fixed number of rows form a vector space.
 Row vector, a matrix with only one row. The row vectors with a fixed number of columns form a vector space.
 Coordinate vector, the -tuple of the coordinates of a vector on a basis of  elements. For a vector space over a field , these -tuples form the vector space  (where the operation are pointwise addition and scalar multiplication).
 Displacement vector, a vector that specifies the change in position of a point relative to a previous position. Displacement vectors belong to the vector space of translations.
 Position vector of a point, the displacement vector from a reference point (called the origin) to the point. A position vector represents the position of a point in a Euclidean space or an affine space.
 Velocity vector, the derivative, with respect to time, of the position vector. It does not depend of the choice of the origin, and, thus belongs to the vector space of translations.
 Pseudovector, also called axial vector
 Covector, an element of the dual of a vector space. In an inner product space, the inner product defines an isomorphism between the space and its dual, which may make difficult to distinguish a covector from a vector. The distinction becomes apparent when one changes coordinates (non-orthogonally).
 Tangent vector, an element of the tangent space of a curve, a surface or, more generally, a differential manifold at a given point (these tangent spaces are naturally endowed with a structure of vector space)
 Normal vector or simply normal, in a Euclidean space or, more generally, in an inner product space, a vector that is perpendicular to a tangent space at a point. 
 Gradient, the coordinates vector of the partial derivatives of a function of several real variables. In a Euclidean space the gradient gives the magnitude and direction of maximum increase of a scalar field. The gradient is a covector that is normal to a level curve.
 Four-vector, in the theory of relativity, a vector in a four-dimensional real vector space called Minkowski space

See also
Vector (mathematics and physics), for a list of various kinds of vectors 

Cartesian coordinate system
Graded vector space
Metric space
P-vector
Riesz–Fischer theorem
Space (mathematics)
Ordered vector space

Notes

Citations

References

Algebra

Analysis

Historical references
 
 
 . 
 
 
 
 , reprint: 
 
 
 
 
 Peano, G. (1901) Formulario mathematico: vct axioms via Internet Archive

Further references

External links

 

Concepts in physics
Group theory
Mathematical structures
Vectors (mathematics and physics)